Mgboko Ngwa is a city in Obingwa local government area of Abia State, Nigeria.

References 

Populated places in Abia State
Villages in Igboland